Voyeurs is the only album by Two, a musical collaboration between vocalist Rob Halford (of Judas Priest) and guitarist John 5 (of Red Square Black, Marilyn Manson and Rob Zombie). Nine Inch Nails' Trent Reznor receives executive-producer credit, with the actual production duties being handled by Bob Marlette and Skinny Puppy's Dave Ogilvie. Voyeurs features Halford's distinctive vocals in an industrial metal context similar to other work by John 5, Reznor and Ogilvie's.

The so-called "pre-Reznor Mixes" of Voyeurs were made available as a free download at Rob Halford's official website in 2002. The download package included "Shout" and "Scream", which remain unreleased. Also included was a demo of "Silent Screams" which was later recorded for Halford's Resurrection. Though the album was unsuccessful in sales, it gained a cult following years later.

Halford expressed interest in releasing the early demos from the album, which he described as being "tougher and edgier" than the final album.

Track listing

Videography
Halford hired porn director Chi Chi LaRue to direct the video for the first single I Am a Pig. This video featured grainy S&M scenes of the band and various porn stars, including a few brief glimpses of Janine Lindemulder, in a sex dungeon. It also incorporates some of the album's artwork into the concept. It was not widely shown for its content, but was not banned. "Deep in the Ground" was released as the second and last single but did not chart or feature a video.

Personnel
Rob Halford – vocals
John 5 – guitar, bass (credited as John Lowery)
Bob Marlette – keyboard, drum programming, bass
Phil Western – keyboard, drum programming
Anthony "Fu" Valcic – keyboard, drum programming

Production
Executive producer – Trent Reznor
Produced by Bob Marlette, with additional production by Dave "Rave" Ogilvie
Engineered by Marlette and Ogilvie
Mixed by Ogilvie, assisted by Gary Winger and Dean Maher
Mastered by Bob Ludwig
Photography by John Eder and Jana Leön
Design and digital manipulation by P. R. Brown
Cover concept by John Baxter, Brown, and Eder

References

1998 debut albums
Two albums
Albums produced by Bob Marlette
Nothing Records albums